Nishikant Kamat (17 June 1970  17 August 2020) was an Indian filmmaker and actor. His debut film, Dombivali Fast earned him accolades in Marathi cinema, as it went on to become the biggest Marathi film of the year. He remade his film, in Tamil with R. Madhavan in the lead as Evano Oruvan, which opened to rave reviews. He also acted in the Marathi film Saatchya Aat Gharat.

His Bollywood debut project was based upon the 2006 Mumbai Bombings, titled, Mumbai Meri Jaan, which was filmed in Hindi. He directed the popular movie Force, starring John Abraham and debut of Vidyut Jamwal. It was a remake of the Tamil movie Kaakha Kaakha. He also played a negative role in the movie Rocky Handsome.

Born in a Marathi family, Kamat was an alumnus of Mumbai's Wilson College and Ramnarain Ruia College where he rose to prominence in the amateur theatre circuit.

Kamat died at the age of 50 following cirrhosis.

Filmography

Television
The Final Call - Creative Producer (2019–present)
Rangbaaz Phirse - Creative Producer

Awards and nominations
National Film Award for Best Feature Film in Marathi for Dombivali Fast in 2006

References

External links

1969 births
2020 deaths
Male actors in Marathi cinema
Marathi film directors
Tamil film directors
People from Sindhudurg district
Male actors from Maharashtra
Film directors from Maharashtra
21st-century Indian film directors
21st-century Indian male actors
Screenwriters from Maharashtra
Marathi screenwriters
Deaths from cirrhosis
|}